Civic Arena may refer to:

In Italy
 Arena Civica, Milan

In Canada:
 Nanaimo Civic Arena, Nanaimo, British Columbia

In the United States:
 Civic Arena (Pittsburgh), Pittsburgh, Pennsylvania
 John F. Kennedy Civic Arena, Rome, New York
 Mentor Civic Arena, Mentor, Ohio
 Midland Civic Arena, Midland, Michigan
Mobile Civic Center, Mobile, Alabama
 St. Joseph Civic Arena, Saint Joseph, Missouri
 Huntington Civic Arena, a former name of the Big Sandy Superstore Arena in Huntington, West Virginia
 Civic Arena, a former name of the SNHU Arena in Manchester, New Hampshire

See also
 Pittsburgh Civic Arena (The Doors album)